Bukholovo is a rural locality (a village) in Tolpukhovskoye Rural Settlement, Sobinsky District, Vladimir Oblast, Russia. The population was 33 as of 2010. There are 3 streets.

Geography 
Bukholovo is located 42 km north of Sobinka (the district's administrative centre) by road. Pavlovskoye is the nearest rural locality.

References 

Rural localities in Sobinsky District
Vladimirsky Uyezd